Philippe Delorme (born 22 January 1960 in Pantin, Seine-Saint-Denis) is a French historian and journalist, whose articles have appeared in Point de Vue, Point de Vue Histoire, and Valeurs actuelles, among others.

He has written numerous biographies of France's great queens, all published by Éditions Pygmalion.

His most celebrated books, L'affaire Louis XVII (Tallandier, 1995, 2000) and Louis XVII : la vérité (Pygmalion, 2000) have attracted intense interest from the public and the media due to their groundbreaking analyses of DNA research on a human heart long-supposed to be that of Louis XVII, who died in the Temple Tower, in Paris, in 1795. In June 2009, Delorme published an edition of the Journal du comte de Chambord (1846–1883) (Ed. Oeil - FX de Guibert), the hitherto unpublished diary of Henri, comte de Chambord, the last Bourbon pretender to the French Crown. In May 2010, he published a nonconformist biography of the French King Henry IV : "Henri IV, les réalités d'un mythe" (Ed. de l'Archipel).

Bibliography 

 Les Rois assassinés (prefaced by Jacques de Bourbon Busset), Bartillat, 1993-2002, republishing Omnia, 2009 (translated in Czech, Polish, Serbian and Albanian).
 L'Affaire Louis XVII, Tallandier, 1995–2000.
 Clovis 496-1996. Enquête sur le XVe centenaire (with Luc de Goustine), Régnier, 2009.
 Les Grimaldi, 700 ans d'une dynastie, Balland, 1997.
 Histoire des Reines de France. Marie de Médicis (prefaced by Isabelle, comtesse de Paris), Pygmalion, 1998.
 Les Princes de la mer (prefaced by dom Duarte de Bragance), Balland, 1998, republishing Bartillat, 2005.
 Histoire des Reines de France. Anne d'Autriche, Pygmalion, 1999–2011.
 Histoire des Reines de France. Marie-Antoinette, Pygmalion, 1999.
 Louis XVII, la vérité. Sa mort au Temple confirmée par la science, Pygmalion, 2000.
 Histoire des Reines de France. Aliénor d'Aquitaine, Pygmalion, 2001.
 Histoire des Reines de France. Blanche de Castille, Pygmalion, 2002.
 La Reine mère. Légendes et vérités (prefaced by Stéphane Bern), Balland, 2002.
 Les Aventuriers de Dieu, Jean Picollec, 2002.
 Histoire des Reines de France. Isabeau de Bavière, Pygmalion, 2003.
 Le Prince. L'incroyable destin de Rainier de Monaco (prefaced by Françoise Laot), Balland, 2004, republishing and completed with the new title : Rainier. Un prince de légende, Michel Lafon, 2005.
 Scandaleuses princesses, Pygmalion, 2005 (translated in Croatian, Czech, Polish and Romanian) - New publishing, revised and augmented, Express Roularta, 2012.
 Albert II de Monaco. Les surprises du prince (prefaced by Jacqueline Monsigny and Edward Meeks), Michel Lafon, 2006.
 L'homme qui rêvait d'être roi. Entretien avec Henri comte de Paris (prefaced by Henri « comte de Paris » et « duc de France »), Buchet-Chastel, 2006.
 Les Princes du malheur. Le destin tragique des enfants de Louis XVI et Marie-Antoinette, Perrin, 2008.
 Henri comte de Chambord. Journal (1846-1883). Carnets inédits. Texte établi et annoté (prefaced by Françoise de Lobkowicz, princesse de Bourbon-Parme), François-Xavier de Guibert, 2009.
 Les Dynasties du monde, collection « Point de vue », Express Roularta, 2009.
 Henri IV, les réalités d'un mythe, L'Archipel, 2010.
 365 Jours d'Histoire royale, collection « Point de vue », Express Roularta, 2010.
 William et Catherine, 150 de noces royales en Grande-Bretagne, collection « Point de vue », Express Roularta, 2011.
 Charlène et ces drôles de dames de Monaco (prefaced by Camilla de Bourbon des Deux-Siciles duchesse de Castro), collection « Point de vue », Express Roularta, 2011.
 Les dynasties perdues (prefaced by the king Simeon II of Bulgaria), collection « Point de vue », Express Roularta, 2011.
 La mauvaise tête de Henri IV. Contre-enquête sur une prétendue découverte (prefaced by professor Joël Cornette), F. Aimard Editeur/Y. Briend Editeur, 2013.
 Rois et princes en 1914, Tours, Sutton, 2014
 Histoire des reines de France : Anne de Kiev, Pygmalion, 2015
 Louis XVII, la biographie, Via Romana, 2015
 Élisabeth II, les jeunes années d'une reine (prefaced by Stéphane Bern), collection Évocations, Sutton, 2016
 Rois et princes en 1939, Sutton, 2016
 Théories folles de l'histoire, Presses de la Cité, 2016 
 Philippe d'Édimbourg, une vie au service de Sa Majesté, Tallandier, 2017 
 Les plus belles heures de Monaco et des Grimaldi, La Boîte à Pandore, 2017 (translated in spanish and italian)
 Petites histoires du quotidien des rois - Été, VA Press, 2017 
 Petites histoires du quotidien des rois - Automne, VA Press, 2017 
 Petites histoires du quotidien des rois - Hiver, VA Press, 2017  
 Ombres et mystères de l'Histoire, Tallandier, 2018  
 Mariages de légende à la cour d'Angleterre - Deux siècles d'amour et de trahison, Editions Jourdan, 2018  (translated in dutch)
 Dictionnaire insolite des dynasties du monde, Editions Via Romana, 2019 
 La légende de Notre-Dame, Anthologie, choix et présentation des textes, Editions du Cerf, 2019 
 Les énigmes de l'Histoire, Editions de l'Opportun, 2019 
 Les incroyables énigmes de l'Histoire, Editions de l'Opportun, 2020 
 Les Rois éphémères, Editions du Cerf, 2020

Sources

1960 births
Living people
People from Pantin
French radio presenters
20th-century French historians
21st-century French historians
20th-century French journalists
21st-century French journalists
Chevaliers of the Ordre des Arts et des Lettres